José Luis Paniagua Sánchez (born August 20, 1973) is a Dominican professional baseball relief pitcher. He appeared in Major League Baseball from 1996 through 2003 with the Montreal Expos, Seattle Mariners, Detroit Tigers, and Chicago White Sox.

Career
Jesús Alou, working as a scout for the Montreal Expos, signed Paniagua in 1990. Paniagua pitched in the Dominican Republic in 1991 and 1992, making his debut in the United States in 1993 in the Rookie-level Gulf Coast League (GCL) with the GCL Expos.

Named one of the Expos' top ten prospects by Baseball America before the 1994 season, Paniagua pitched for the West Palm Beach Expos of the Class A-Advanced Florida State League that year. In 1995, Paniagua started the season with the Harrisburg Senators of the Class AA Eastern League, but was promoted to the Ottawa Lynx of the Class AAA International League to pitch in the Governors' Cup, the league championship series. He pitched in game one, recording the win.

Paniagua made his major league debut on April 5, 1996, defeating the Cincinnati Reds, as the Expos needed a starter to replace the injured Carlos Pérez. However, the Expos sent him back to the minor leagues later that month, when Perez returned. In 22 games for the Expos in 1996 and 1997, Paniagua pitched to a 3–6 win–loss record with a 5.74 earned run average.

The Tampa Bay Devil Rays selected Paniagua from the Expos in the 1997 Major League Baseball expansion draft. Later that offseason, the Seattle Mariners selected Paniagua from waivers. Paniagua spent most of the 1998 season with the Tacoma Rainiers, the Mariners' Class AAA affiliate, which play in the Pacific Coast League. He received a promotion to the Mariners in August, joining the Mariners' bullpen as a relief pitcher.

On December 16, 2001, the Mariners traded Paniagua with Brian Fuentes and Denny Stark to the Colorado Rockies for Jeff Cirillo. Though the Rockies intended to send Paniagua to the Detroit Tigers for Shane Halter, the trade fell apart. On March 25, 2002, the Rockies traded Paniagua to the Detroit Tigers for Víctor Santos and Ronnie Merrill. The Tigers released Paniagua during September.

Paniagua signed as a free agent with the Devil Rays in February 2003, but was released in March. He played for the Rojos del Águila de Veracruz in the Mexican League, until the Chicago White Sox purchased him on August 26, 2003. He appeared in one game with the White Sox, on September 9. Paniagua entered the game with a six-run lead in the ninth inning. He then was pulled from the game by manager Jerry Manuel. On his way to the dugout, he started arguing with umpire Mark Carlson, who ejected him. Paniagua responded by giving Carlson the finger. The White Sox released him the next day. Although he expressed remorse for his actions in a meeting with Manuel and general manager Kenny Williams, it wasn't enough to save his job; Williams said that he could understand Paniagua was somewhat rusty, but felt that "the loss of composure at a crucial time or situation is just something we can’t tolerate."

Paniagua hasn't pitched in the majors since. He signed with the New York Mets in January 2007, but was released in March.  The San Diego Padres signed him in July; he was granted free agency in October.  He also saw time in the Florida Marlins and Pittsburgh Pirates organizations.

Paniagua split 2008 in independent league baseball between the St. George RoadRunners of the Golden Baseball League and the Long Island Ducks of the Atlantic League of Professional Baseball.

References

External links

1973 births
Living people
Águilas Cibaeñas players
Altoona Curve players
Cardenales de Lara players
Charlotte Knights players
Chicago White Sox players
Detroit Tigers players
Dominican Republic expatriate baseball players in Canada
Dominican Republic expatriate baseball players in Mexico
Dominican Republic expatriate baseball players in the United States
Gulf Coast Expos players
Gulf Coast Pirates players
Harrisburg Senators players
Leones del Escogido players
Long Island Ducks players
Major League Baseball pitchers
Major League Baseball players from the Dominican Republic
Mexican League baseball pitchers
Montreal Expos players
Ottawa Lynx players
People from San José de Ocoa Province
Rojos del Águila de Veracruz players
Seattle Mariners players
St. George Roadrunners players
Tacoma Rainiers players
Toledo Mud Hens players
West Palm Beach Expos players
Dominican Summer League Marlins players
Macoto Cobras players
Dominican Republic expatriate baseball players in Taiwan
Dominican Republic expatriate baseball players in Venezuela